This is a list of tourist attractions in Wales, sorting attractions by settlement, protected area and popularity from across the country of Wales, United Kingdom.

By settlement 
The following list are of attractions in notable settlements in Wales.

 Cardiff – the capital and largest city. The city has three major performing arts venues: the Wales Millennium Centre, St David's Hall and New Theatre. Other tourist attractions include Cardiff Castle, Millennium Stadium, SWALEC Stadium, National Museum of Wales, Museum of Welsh Life, Llandaff Cathedral, Castell Coch, St. David's and in Cardiff Bay, Techniquest, Cardiff International Pool, Cardiff International White Water, the Senedd and the Pierhead Building. There is an unstaffed Tourist Information Centre in the city centre's Old Library.
 Swansea – the second-largest city. Attractions here include the Dylan Thomas Centre, Dylan Thomas trail, National Waterfront Museum, Glynn Vivian Art Gallery. The Gower Peninsula is the first Area of Outstanding Natural Beauty in Wales and sites such as Worm's Head and Rhossili are considered scenic.
 Newport – the third-largest city in Wales. An influx of visitors occurred in 2010 when the city hosted golf's Ryder Cup at the Celtic Manor Resort. Attractions include Tredegar House and Gardens, the Transporter Bridge, the ancient Roman fortress at Caerleon and National Roman Legion Museum. The Big Pit National Coal Museum is at Blaenavon.
 Wrexham – Wales' newest city, and largest settlement in north Wales, which was awarded the status in 2022. The city houses Wales' oldest football club, Wrexham A.F.C., housed in the world's oldest still in use international stadium, the Racecourse Ground, one of the Seven Wonders of Wales at St Giles' Church, Wales' largest music festival Focus Wales, Tŷ Pawb, Xplore!, the oldest German-style lager brand Wrexham Lager, and the country house at Erddig.
 Bangor – the oldest city in Wales and its cathedral dates to the 6th century. The city is located in Gwynedd in North West Wales, near the Menai Strait waters. Bangor also has a pier and a National Trust mansion known as Penrhyn Castle as well as Wales' longest High Street.
 St Asaph, in Denbighshire with a population of 3,500, awarded city status in 2012.
 St David's – the smallest city in Wales and is a cathedral in Pembrokeshire, Wales, lying on the River Alun. It is the resting place of Saint David, Wales's patron saint, and named after him.

 Llandudno – among the top three holiday destinations in Wales. Attractions in include the promenade, its beach, the Alice in Wonderland trail, the Great Orme, its cablecar and its tramway.
 Dolgellau – a town located close to Cadair Idris mountain on the approach to the Afon Mawddach estuary. Other attractions include the Mawddach Trail, Precipice Walk and Coed-y-Brenin biking centre.

 Aberystwyth – a coastal university town and popular holiday resort and may be a "convenient base" for the Coastal Way. The town has a promenade, castle and university and is the home of the National Library of Wales, Aberystwyth Arts Centre and Vale of Rheidol Railway.

 Hay on Wye – The town hosts the Hay Festival and the How the Light Gets In festival.

 Tenby – featured as Wales' most popular holiday destination in recent years.
 Merthyr Tydfil – attractions include Cyfarthfa Castle, Cyfartha museum and art gallery, BikePark Wales (the biggest mountain biking resort in Wales), Rock UK Summit Centre, Parkwood Outdoors Dolygaer, Brecon Mountain Railway, Redhouse Cymru, Joseph Parry's Cottage, Garwnant Visitor Centre on the edge of the Brecon Beacons, and multiple golf courses.
 Barry – a seaside town that includes Barry Island. Its attractions include beaches, Barry Island Pleasure Park, and various sites associated with Gavin and Stacey TV series.

National parks 

At present, Wales has three national parks: Snowdonia, Pembrokeshire Coast and the Brecon Beacons National Park, as well as five areas of outstanding natural beauty (AONB), which together form the Protected areas of Wales.

Landscape features 
Many features of the Welsh landscape that are popular with visitors, include:

 Snowdon in Snowdonia is the highest mountain in Wales.
 Pen y Fan is the highest peak in South Wales and is located in Brecon Beacons National Park.

 Wye Valley Area of Outstanding Natural Beauty 
 Offa's Dyke Path is an 8th-century monument and long distance footpath on the Welsh-English border.
 Taff Trail is a foot and cycle path running along the River Taff through the city and countryside, from Cardiff Bay to Brecon.
 Glyndŵr's Way is a long-distance trail between Knighton and Welshpool in Powys.
 The Gower Peninsula is the first Area of Outstanding Natural Beauty in Wales and sites such as Worm's Head and Rhossili are considered scenic.
 The Vale of Neath includes multiple waterfalls and has been included in a list of the ‘World’s Top 10 places to ride’ according to ‘What Mountain Bike’.
 The Wales Coast Path, an 870 mile long-distance footpath which follows the whole of the coastline of Wales.

Independent attractions 
There are several notable independent attractions:

 Llanberis offers the Snowdon Mountain Railway, National Slate Museum, the Llanberis Lake Railway, Electric Mountain and Padarn country park.
 Oakwood Theme Park, Pembrokeshire
 National Botanic Garden of Wales, Carmarthenshire
 WWT Llanelli Wetland Centre, Carmarthenshire
 Great Little Trains of Wales, all twelve heritage steam railways in Wales.
 Folly Farm Adventure Park and Zoo
 Brecon Mountain Railway

Top 10 paid attractions 

The following are the most popular paid attractions in Wales (2019) in order of the number of visits:

 LC, Swansea – a waterpark and leisure complex
 Cardiff Castle
 Folly Farm
 Bodnant Garden
 Portmeirion
 Zip World Fforest
 Dyffryn Gardens
 Welsh Mountain Zoo
 National Botanic Garden of Wales
 Zip World Penrhyn Quarry

Top 10 free attractions 

The following are the most popular free attractions in Wales (2019) in order of the number of visits:

 Wales Millennium Centre
 Tir Prince Fun Park
 St Fagans National Museum of History
 Aberystwyth Arts Centre
 Pembrey Country Park
 Snowdon
 National Museum Cardiff
 Pontcysyllte Aqueduct
 Llandegfedd Visitor Centre
 National Waterfront Museum

See also 

 Wales Coast Path

 Castles in Wales
 Abbeys and priories in Wales
 List of museums in Wales
 Heritage railways in Wales
 Tourism in Wales

References 

Tourism in Wales
Welsh culture